Gustavo "Gus" Fring is a fictional character portrayed by Giancarlo Esposito in the Breaking Bad franchise, serving as the main antagonist of the crime drama series Breaking Bad and a major character in its prequel Better Call Saul. He is a Chilean-American businessman and major narcotics distributor in the Southwestern United States who uses several legitimate businesses, including a chain of successful fast food restaurants called Los Pollos Hermanos (The Chicken Brothers) and an industrial laundry facility called Lavandería Brillante (Bright Laundry), as fronts used to launder money for a vast drug operation. Though outwardly he works with the Mexican cartel to distribute cocaine, he secretly plots revenge against its members over the death of his business associate and romantic partner Maximino "Max" Arciniega at the hands of Hector Salamanca, the patriarch of the cartel-backed drug trade in the Southwest. To become independent of the cartel's cocaine, he constructs a secret lab under the industrial laundry to manufacture methamphetamine.

Fring was created as a character to replace that of Tuco Salamanca (played by departing actor Raymond Cruz) during the second season of Breaking Bad. Gus, as a stoic businessman, was created to be opposite to that of the chaotic Tuco and act as a foil to Walter White. The character has received high acclaim, and Esposito's performance in the role has earned him several nominations and awards.

Character development 

Gustavo Fring is named after the former German international footballer Torsten Frings.

When Raymond Cruz was unable to continue as Tuco Salamanca in Breaking Bad second season due to his commitment to appear in The Closer, the Breaking Bad writers wrote Tuco out of the series and created the character of Gus to be his opposite. While Tuco was a meth user and "a screaming lunatic", Gus would be "a bit of a buttoned-down, cold-blooded, soft-spoken businessman".

Initially, Giancarlo Esposito was offered a character that was described to him as "very admirable, very polite", and he decided to play that character as if he had "some kind of a secret". Without knowing what that secret was, Esposito understood the potential Gus had as a growing character, therefore rejecting offers for guest appearances as originally intended for the character and insisting on becoming a series regular. To achieve Gus' trademark calmness, Esposito used yoga techniques, which allowed him to convey the character as being "a very good listener".

The humanity of Gus' personality played an integral role in his development. The loss of Max, his boyfriend, contributed to Gus' evolution into a ruthless criminal; he stops at nothing to avenge Max's death, including the gradual killing of Hector's entire family. The loss of Max also cultivated Gus's desire to create a new "family" by empowering his meth empire, as well as the chicken restaurants. Moments before dying, Gus manages to calmly adjust his tie even after having half his face blown off. Esposito saw it as an important gesture of "when a person goes to what they've always done ... to be complete in his leaving this world".

Gus' popularity, as well as his importance to the series' development, made room for possible "flashback" type appearances in future episodes, but that idea did not come to fruition until 2017 when Gus was brought back for the third season of Better Call Saul. When conceiving the story for El Camino: A Breaking Bad Movie, Gilligan considered including Gus in the story, but ultimately desisted from the idea due to his feelings that the film should focus only in the most important characters in Jesse Pinkman's life, which Gus was not.

Character overview
Gus has a mysterious background; his name is likely an alias, since neither the DEA nor his own enforcer Mike Ehrmantraut could find any record of him prior to his arrival in Mexico. He is supposedly a native of Chile, and is sometimes referred to by cartel members as "The Chilean". In the Better Call Saul episode "Piñata", he tells a comatose Hector a story about a coati that ate the fruit from a lúcuma tree which he tended during his childhood in Chile. In the Better Call Saul episode "Magic Man", Lalo Salamanca refers to a mysterious incident involving Gus which took place in Santiago. Gus immigrated to Mexico in the 1980s during the Chilean dictatorship of Augusto Pinochet, and in a flashback during the Breaking Bad episode "One Minute", Hector mockingly refers to him as "Big Generalissimo", implying that Gus had a connection to the Pinochet regime. As mentioned in the Better Call Saul episode "JMM", Gus and Peter Schuler had a shared experience in Santiago, which Gus mentions to Peter to calm him down when he panics over Lalo's attacks on Gus' business. In "Hermanos", Eladio says that when he ordered Max killed, he spared Gus because of his unstated but apparently powerful connection to Chile. Vince Gilligan has stated that he purposely left Gus's origins ambiguous, comparing them to the briefcase in Pulp Fiction.

Gus runs at least two legitimate businesses: a chain of successful fried chicken restaurants called Los Pollos Hermanos (The Chicken Brothers) and an industrial laundry facility called Lavandería Brillante (Bright Laundry) in Albuquerque, New Mexico. Gus' restaurants are located across the southwestern United States, with his flagship restaurant in Albuquerque, and the firm's chicken farm and distribution center on the outskirts of the city. The company is a subsidiary of Madrigal Electromotive GmbH, a multinational company based in Germany that has ownership stakes in multiple subsidiaries. While his restaurant chain is a legitimate business, it serves as a front for Gus to distribute cocaine for a Mexican cartel and later develop his own methamphetamine production and distribution business. Gus operates in partnership with two Madrigal executives: Peter Schuler, a German who serves as the company president, and Lydia Rodarte-Quayle, the company's Houston-based vice president of global logistics. 

Gus maintains a positive public image: he is a booster for Albuquerque civic causes, including the local Drug Enforcement Administration (DEA) office; in addition to befriending the special agent in charge, Gus makes large donations to the office's charitable events. Underneath this outwardly pleasant front, he is ruthless, cruel, and Machiavellian in managing his vast drug empire. He employs a number of enforcers and has personally killed both rivals and allies.

Sexuality 
Much of Gus' motives are driven by revenge for the death of his partner Maximino "Max" Arciniega by the Mexican cartel. Gus and Max's relationship was long implied to be more than business before their confirmation as lovers by showrunner Peter Gould in 2022. In the Better Call Saul episode "Sabrosito", Hector suggests that a better name for Los Pollos Hermanos might be "Los Culos Hermanos" (The Butt Brothers), insinuating that Gus and Max were gay. In "Magic Man", Lalo discusses Gus with Bolsa and refers to Max as Gus' boyfriend. As shown in the Better Call Saul episode "Dedicado a Max", after arriving in Albuquerque, Gus acquired a small villa on the Mexican side of the Mexico–U.S. border. The villa serves as the residence for Dr. Barry Goodman, and contains a fountain which is dedicated to Max. Gus's homosexuality is touched on in the episode "Fun and Games", in which he relaxes after having eliminated Lalo as a threat to his plans by visiting a wine bar and conversing with David, his favorite sommelier. Gus drops hints of his interest in David before deciding to cut the visit short and depart. In 2020, Gilligan stated that "I personally think Max was more than just a friend to Gus. I think they probably were lovers." Gould later confirmed that Gus and Max were boyfriends on the Ringer podcast The Watch.

Character biography

Background 
The Breaking Bad episode "Hermanos" shows that Gus and his long-time business partner and boyfriend Max Arciniega started Los Pollos Hermanos as a front to sell methamphetamine that Max "cooked". They approached Don Eladio Vuente, the leader of the Juárez cartel, with an offer to expand their drug trade with cartel help; Eladio declined, as the cartel preferred to continue distributing cocaine. Instead, Eladio had Hector Salamanca kill Max for selling meth in cartel territory without permission. Eladio spared Gus, but forced him to co-operate with the cartel on Eladio's terms. For the next 20 years, Gus remains outwardly loyal to the cartel but nurses a grudge against Eladio, Juan Bolsa, and Hector, waiting for his chance at revenge. After establishing himself in Albuquerque, Gus secretly looks to end his dependency on cartel cocaine by producing and distributing meth in the United States. Because the Salamanca family drug business controlled by Hector also includes Albuquerque, Gus is forced to deal with him but seeks to undermine the Salamancas.

Better Call Saul

Season 3 

Nacho Varga pays Mike to help remove Tuco Salamanca, Hector's nephew, from the day-to-day activities of the Salamanca family drug business. Instead of killing Tuco, Mike arranges for Tuco to assault him in view of the police, leading to Tuco's arrest. Mike fears Hector will learn that Mike arranged for Tuco's imprisonment and is concerned that Hector will retaliate against Stacey and Kaylee. Mike acts preemptively by preparing to assassinate Hector, but is interrupted at the last moment. Mike tracks this interruption to Gus, who explains that he wants to be the one to determine when Hector will die. However, Gus encourages Mike to continue to disrupt the trucks Hector uses to bring ice cream store supplies and drugs from Mexico and send cash back to the cartel. After Mike disrupts two shipments without revealing his identity, Hector demands that Gus temporarily use his Los Pollos Hermanos trucks to ship both Hector's and Gus's drugs. Gus, who had wanted this result from the start, appears to reluctantly agree. He later attempts to pay Mike, but Mike refuses the money. Instead, he asks for assistance laundering the $250,000 he stole from one of Hector's trucks, which Gus provides by arranging for Madrigal Electromotive to hire Mike as a contracted security expert and pay him monthly consulting fees.

With the new transport agreement in place, Nacho and Arturo Colon arrive at the Los Pollos Hermanos warehouse and farm to pick up a drug shipment, and Nacho attempts to strong-arm his way into taking six kilos instead of the agreed-upon five. When Gus's subordinate Tyrus Kitt calls Gus for guidance, Gus recognizes an opportunity to infiltrate the Salamanca organization and tells Tyrus to give Nacho the extra kilo. Nacho fears that Hector will learn of his role in Tuco's imprisonment and is concerned about Hector's intent to take over Nacho's father's upholstery store for use as a front business. He secretly swaps Hector's angina medication for a placebo, hoping to induce a fatal heart attack. At a meeting between Juan Bolsa, Gus, Hector and Nacho, Bolsa informs them that the use of Gus's trucks to move the drugs and cash for both organizations will be a permanent arrangement. Hector's angry outburst leads to a stroke, and Gus calls for an ambulance while administering first aid that saves Hector's life, though he is comatose. Nacho follows Mike's previous advice to switch the placebos for Hector's real medication so that foul play will not be suspected. Gus appears to notice Nacho's actions, but says nothing.

Season 4 

Hector is rushed to the hospital, while Gus, Nacho, and Arturo are summoned to a meeting with Bolsa at the Los Pollos distribution plant, where Bolsa declares that until further notice, the Salamanca operation will continue with Nacho and Arturo in charge.

Leonel and Marco Salamanca (the Cousins) arrive to watch over Hector. Gus hires a doctor to oversee Hector's recovery. While reviewing Hector's medical records, Gus realizes there is no nitroglycerin in Hector's system, meaning Nacho tried to kill him. When Nacho and Arturo arrive at the chicken farm to pick up their next shipment, Gus suffocates and kills Arturo, tells Nacho that he knows what Nacho did, and unless Nacho follows his orders, he will inform the Salamancas. Tyrus and Victor make Arturo's death and a violent attack on Nacho look like the work of the Espinosas, while Victor sells the drugs from Nacho's car to them. Nacho falsely identifies the Espinosas to the Cousins, who massacre the Espinosas to recover the "stolen" drugs before returning to Mexico to avoid the authorities. Gus orders Hector's treatment halted after he has regained movement in his right index finger, leaving his recovered mind trapped in his unhealed body.

Gus works with Mike to plan the construction of an underground meth "superlab" under Lavandería Brillante, an industrial laundry he owns, using a design provided by chemist Gale Boetticher. Mike escorts engineers through the laundry and questions them about their ability to construct the lab as Gus secretly listens in. Gus offers the job to Werner Ziegler after being impressed by Werner's forthright description of the difficulty and risk. Gus provides long-term housing and amenities for Werner's crew, while Mike provides security and transportation designed to keep their presence a secret. Werner inadvertently provides details of underground concrete construction to patrons during an outing at a bar and Mike ends the conversation. The next day, Mike makes a veiled warning to Werner that Gus will have him killed if he makes the same mistake again, and Werner acknowledges that he understands.

Lalo Salamanca arrives to oversee the Salamanca drug business. He is immediately suspicious of Gus and surveils his restaurant and chicken farm. With construction behind schedule, Werner misses his wife and effects an escape to rendezvous with her. Mike convinces Gus to let Mike find Werner and bring him back instead of killing him. Mike tracks Werner to a money wire store and then to a nearby resort. Lalo follows Mike, kills Fred the money wire clerk to obtain the information Mike discovered, then calls resorts until he finds Werner. By pretending to work for Gus, Lalo discovers from Werner some of the details of the lab's construction before Mike arrives and ends the call. Knowing that Lalo can track Werner's actions back to Gus, Gus says Werner must be killed. Gus offers to send men to do it, but Mike accepts responsibility because Werner escaped on his watch, so he reluctantly kills Werner himself.

Season 5 

Gus arranges for Nacho to take cocaine of inferior quality when picking up the Salamanca's drugs at Los Pollos Hermanos. Rumors of the "stepped on" product reach Nacho and Domingo Molina, who report them to Lalo. Lalo confirms the impurity of the cocaine during a visit to Salamanca street dealers.  In a meeting with Lalo and Juan Bolsa, Gus falsely claims that Werner Ziegler was working under Mike's supervision to construct a chilling system for Gus's chicken farm and that Werner fled after stealing cocaine.  Gus goes on to claim that in an effort to hide the loss, he replaced the stolen cocaine with locally produced methamphetamine.  The story explains events of which Lalo is aware, including Werner's departure from Albuquerque, pursuit by Mike, and subsequent death.  Lalo accepts Gus's cover story and apology but remains suspicious.  Juan reminds Lalo that Gus enjoys the trust of Don Eladio, and indicates that Lalo should let the matter drop.  Because Lalo remains suspicious, Gus shuts down construction of the underground meth lab and has Mike send Werner's workers home. Gus offers to continue paying Mike during the delay, but Mike declines out of frustration over Gus's seeming lack of compassion for Werner.

Gus coerces Nacho into providing inside information on the Salamancas. Nacho gains Lalo's trust, and after Domingo is arrested, Nacho and Lalo use Jimmy McGill/Saul Goodman to secure Domingo's release from jail in exchange for the location of several of Gus's dead drops. Nacho reports the plan to Gus, who plans to cancel the drops, but Nacho advises that this will reveal a mole within the Salamanca organization. Gus agrees and on the night of the transfer he tensely waits as Victor and Diego make sure that the DEA and local police seize nearly a million dollars but find no leads to Gus.

Mike spends several weeks feeling depressed over Werner's death and drinks to excess. After he is injured by a local gang, Gus has him taken to a pueblo Gus owns just inside the Mexican border, which includes a fountain dedicated to Max. Dr. Barry Goodman tends to Mike's wounds and Mike stays to heal. Gus visits and asks Mike to join his organization, saying that he wants Mike with him because Mike understands his need for revenge.

Gus arranges for Nacho to report to Mike about his activities to undermine the Salamanca organization. Mike works under an assumed name to secretly point the police toward Lalo for the murder of Fred the money wire store clerk. Lalo is surrounded by police and arrested. In jail under an assumed name, Lalo contacts Nacho and says he wants Nacho to burn down Gus's flagship Los Pollos Hermanos restaurant. Gus and other subsidiary owners provide status reports to Peter Schuler, Madrigal's CEO. Afterward, Gus briefs Peter and Lydia on the status of the meth lab, and Gus assures Peter he will get the plan back on track. When Gus returns home, he and Nacho preserve Nacho's role as the mole in the Salamanca organization by destroying Gus's restaurant. Gus wants Lalo released, so he has Mike provide Jimmy with the details of his investigation into Lalo. Jimmy uses the information to accuse police of witness tampering, enabling him to win a motion to release Lalo on bail.

Jimmy drives to a remote desert location to pick up the bail money from The Cousins. As he starts his return trip, he is cut off by several gunmen who take the money and prepare to kill him. The gunmen are suddenly attacked by an unknown shooter. All but one are killed, and the survivor gets away in the only attacker's vehicle that is still drivable. The unseen shooter was Mike, who was tracking Jimmy for Gus. Mike's truck was also damaged, so Jimmy and he recover the money and begin the drive back to Albuquerque in Jimmy's car. When the car breaks down, Jimmy and Mike take the money and walk cross-country to avoid the surviving gunman. After a night in the desert, Mike kills the surviving gunman and they resume walking.

Jimmy and Mike eventually make their way to a truck stop, where Tyrus and Victor pick them up. Mike and Jimmy agree on a cover story for Jimmy to tell Lalo after Jimmy posts his bail. Jimmy tells Lalo he was alone and walked after his car broke down so that he would not put the money at risk. Lalo says he intends to return to Mexico in order to avoid the scrutiny of police and prosecutors. Mike briefs Gus on the events in the desert, and Gus realizes the attack was ordered by Juan Bolsa to protect Gus's business. Mike tells Gus that Nacho wants to end his work as an informant on the Salamancas, but Gus refuses to part with a valuable asset.

As Gus oversees the cleanup and rebuilding of the Los Pollos Hermanos restaurant that was burned down, Mike informs him that Lalo has returned to his home in Chihuahua, and that Nacho is with him. Gus says he has sent gunmen to kill Lalo, and that Nacho may be able to help. Nacho receives a call instructing him to leave Lalo's back gate open at 3 a.m. Nacho asks for Lalo's family to be spared. Lalo is awake at 3 a.m. so Nacho sets a kitchen fire as a distraction. When Lalo goes to investigate, Nacho opens the gate and flees. The gunmen enter, kill Lalo's family, and wound Lalo. Lalo escapes the house through a hidden tunnel, then sneaks back in and kills all but one gunman. He then forces the survivor to call the middleman who arranged the killing and report that Lalo is dead.

Season 6 

In the aftermath of the firefight at Lalo's home, Lalo kills a local farmer to use as a body double and the Cousins report that Lalo is dead. Gus is skeptical, wondering how all the hitmen died, but succeeded in killing Lalo. Gus arranges for Nacho to hide at a motel while he awaits transport to the U.S. Gus and Juan Bolsa meet with Hector Salamanca to offer condolences and promise revenge, but Hector's demeanor convinces Gus that Lalo is still alive. Mike and Gus's men break into Nacho's safe and remove his cash and the fake Canadian IDs he had made for himself and his father. Victor delivers a duplicate safe, into which Mike places the cash, Nacho's fake ID, and an envelope. Juan Bolsa and his men break into the duplicate safe and find the envelope containing the motel's phone number and details of an offshore bank account. Nacho believes he is being observed, confronts the watcher, and confirms he is working for Gus. Nacho realizes Gus has betrayed him to the cartel and prepares to flee, but the Cousins arrive to search for him.

Nacho escapes the ambush and hides from the Cousins. After making a farewell call to his father, he calls Mike and asks to speak to Gus. Nacho offers to give himself up as long as his father is protected. Gus arranges to smuggle Nacho into the U.S., and Mike and Nacho review Gus's plan for Nacho to absolve Gus of blame for Lalo's death. Nacho will say he was working for a rival drug family, then attempt to flee. Victor will then kill him, ensuring that he is not tortured by the Salamancas. As Mike takes up a firing position with his rifle, Gus, Victor, and Tyrus hand Nacho over to Juan Bolsa, Hector Salamanca, and the Cousins. Nacho claims he was working for the rival Alvarez family when he killed Lalo, and backs up his story by revealing that he attempted to kill Hector, but that Gus saved him. Rather than attempt to flee so Victor can kill him, Nacho uses a piece of broken glass to free himself from his restraints, seize Juan's gun, and kill himself.

Convinced that Lalo is alive, Gus takes precautions including wearing a bulletproof vest under his clothes and carrying a gun. While a body double takes his place in his home, Gus uses a tunnel system to enter a nearby house, which is revealed to be an operations center from which he oversees vast surveillance activities that scour Albuquerque for signs of Lalo. His belief that Lalo is alive causes Gus sleeplessness and distractions while working at his restaurant. Gus visits the construction site of his planned meth lab and inspects it carefully before hiding a handgun in the track of an excavator.

Lalo kills Howard Hamlin at the apartment of Jimmy McGill and Kim Wexler, then provides Jimmy the address and description of the man he wants Jimmy to shoot. Jimmy convinces Lalo to send Kim instead. Mike apprehends her at the front door of Gus' house, and she points out Gus' body double as the man Lalo wanted to be killed. Mike and his men leave for Jimmy and Kim's apartment, but when Kim tells Gus that Lalo agreed to send her instead of Jimmy, Gus recognizes the shooting is a distraction. He drives to Lavandería Brillante, where Lalo ambushes him and kills his bodyguards. Lalo is using a video camera to obtain evidence of Gus' planned meth lab for Don Eladio, which will prove Gus' disloyalty to the cartel. Lalo forces Gus at gunpoint to lead him to the site, Gus then insults Eladio and the Salamancas as Lalo videotapes him, but Gus' speech is a diversion that enables him to cause a power outage which turns off the lights. In the darkness, he reaches the handgun he hid previously and fires at Lalo. After turning the lights back on, he finds that he is wounded, but he has fatally wounded Lalo. As Gus is treated at home, Mike supervises the burial of Lalo and Howard beneath the meth lab.

Hector contacts Don Eladio with information about Lalo's survival and subsequent disappearance, and claims Gus killed Lalo. Eladio meets with Juan Bolsa, Gus, Hector, Marco, and Leonel. Gus denies Hector's allegations and since there is no proof that Lalo survived, Eladio accepts that he was killed in the first assassination attempt. To keep peace between Hector and Gus, Eladio divides between them the drug territory around Albuquerque. After returning to the U.S., Gus tells Mike to immediately re-start work on the planned meth lab. Gus later patronizes a restaurant where he converses pleasantly with David, his favorite sommelier. When David leaves to retrieve a rare bottle to show Gus, Gus cuts his visit short and leaves the restaurant.

Breaking Bad

Season 2 

When Walter White seeks a buyer for his high-quality meth, Saul Goodman arranges a meeting with the unknown purchaser. Walt and his partner, Jesse Pinkman, arrive at a Los Pollos Hermanos restaurant in the South Valley, but the buyer seemingly never shows up, with Jesse and Walt unaware that Gus, the restaurant manager, had been silently watching them. Walt realizes this later and arranges a second meeting with only himself and Gus. Gus tells him that he is not interested in conducting business since Jesse was late and high for the first meeting, and is thus potentially unreliable. Walt persuades Gus to reconsider his decision, promising that he will never have to deal with Jesse and that their product will earn him enormous returns. Gus eventually agrees to purchase 38 pounds of Walt's meth for $1.2 million but only if it can be delivered within a limited time at a remote location. With Jesse unconscious after using heroin with his girlfriend Jane Margolis, Walt is forced to miss the birth of his daughter Holly to make the delivery. Shortly afterward, Gus is given a tour of the DEA's Albuquerque field office, along with other local boosters. While there, he discovers that Walt has lung cancer and that his brother-in-law, Hank Schrader, is a DEA agent.

Season 3 

Gus is pleased with the quality of Walt's blue meth and offers him $3 million for three months of his time to cook more in a high-tech "superlab" hidden under an industrial laundry that Gus owns. Walt initially refuses, but Gus eventually convinces Walt that he should cook for his family's financial security. Gus provides him with Gale Boetticher, the talented chemist who set up the superlab, to help cook, but Walt needs to placate Jesse after Hank assaults him, so he convinces Gus to bring Jesse back as his assistant. Gus informs the cartel that once Walt is done with his three months, they will be free to kill him. Leonel and Marco Salamanca are impatient and travel from Mexico to the US to carry out the murder, but Gus intervenes and points them to Hank, who actually killed Tuco. Gus anonymously warns Hank about the pending attack, enabling Hank to kill Marco and critically injure Leonel, despite becoming nearly paralyzed from the waist down. Gus uses his influence with the police to distract them at the hospital so Mike can fatally inject Leonel.

The attempt on Hank's life leads to a large-scale crackdown on the cartel, and Juan Bolsa is killed. Realizing his own life was at stake, Walt agrees to continue cooking in the superlab for an extended period for $15 million with Jesse aiding him, but Gus is still concerned about Jesse's loyalties. Jesse learns that drug dealers who work for Gus were responsible for the death of Tomás, the young brother of Jesse's girlfriend Andrea. Before Jesse can kill them himself, Walt runs them over with his car and tells Jesse to flee. Walt explains to Gus that this was just a "hiccup" in their agreement. Gus agrees to overlook the matter but reinstates Gale as Walt's assistant, and privately tells Gale to learn all of Walt's methods so that he can take over from Walt. Walt realizes that Gus is trying to groom Gale as his replacement, meaning his life is at risk, so he secretly meets with Jesse and asks him to find out where Gale lives. Once Jesse finds Gale's apartment, Walt sets out to kill him, but Victor stops him and brings him to the lab, where Mike is waiting. Walt asks Mike to let him call Jesse and convince him to come to the lab, but instead, Walt tells Jesse to kill Gale. Victor rushes to Gale's apartment, but Jesse arrives first and murders Gale.

Season 4 

Furious upon learning of Gale's murder, Gus arrives at the lab, where Walt and Jesse have been secured by Victor and Mike. Knowing he was recognized at Gale's apartment, Victor fears for his life and attempts to show his continued usefulness to Gus by beginning to cook meth, which he learned how to do while guarding Walt and Jesse. Walt begs for Gus to spare them, but they are shocked when Gus slices open Victor's neck and lets him bleed to death in front of them. Gus calmly tells Walt and Jesse to get back to work and increases oversight in the lab by installing security cameras and having Mike and Tyrus watch them while they work. Mike suggests to Gus that they may be able to drive a wedge between Walt and Jesse. Mike takes Jesse out of the lab to help pick up dead drops and carry out other tasks and arranges for Jesse to foil a pre-planned attack on him, which boosts Jesse's confidence and increases his sense of loyalty to Mike and Gus. Gus is impressed by Jesse's mettle and has Mike involve him in more work outside the lab. Worried about their safety, Walt gives Jesse a cigarette with a capsule of ricin hidden inside and tells him to poison Gus when he gets the chance, but Jesse does not follow through.

Gus arranges to meet with Don Eladio and the other cartel leaders to work out the differences that have caused the cartel to disrupt Gus' business and he brings Mike and Jesse with him. Jesse cooks a superior batch of meth and Gus offers to have him stay in Mexico and work for the cartel.  Jesse is apprehensive, but the offer is a ruse.  During the party at Eladio's house to celebrate their rapprochement, Gus tricks Eladio and most of the other cartel leaders into drinking from a poisoned bottle of tequila. Gus takes the first drink to alleviate suspicion but forces himself to vomit afterward. During the fight that ensues after cartel leaders begin dying from the poison's effects, Jesse helps the ill Gus and wounded Mike escape, killing Hector's last known living grandson, Joaquin Salamanca, in the process.  He brings them to Dr. Goodman's makeshift hospital that Gus had previously arranged at his villa, where both receive treatment.  After recovering, Gus returns to Albuquerque and taunts Hector, telling him the cartel leaders are all dead, and that because of Joaquin's death, the Salamanca family line ends with Hector.  Jesse is no longer loyal to Walt and refuses to serve as his protector.  With the DEA beginning to connect Gale's death to Gus, Gus fires Walt and threatens to kill Walt's family if he retaliates or informs.

Considering his life at risk, Walt attempts to kill Gus with a pipe bomb attached to his car, but Gus senses something amiss and walks away from the vehicle. Panicked, Walt recovers the bomb and hides at his home.  After unsuccessfully attempting to enlist Jesse's help in killing Gus, Walt poisons Andrea's son Brock and convinces Jesse that Gus is responsible. Jesse agrees to help Walt and tells him about Gus' routine, including his visits to Hector at the nursing home. Persuaded by Walt's promise of a final revenge against Gus, Hector pretends to have become a DEA informant. Gus visits Hector and prepares to kill him with a lethal injection, but Hector begins ringing the bell on his wheelchair to activate the pipe bomb. Seeing the bomb attached beneath Hector's seat, Gus tries to flee the room. The bomb explodes, killing Hector and Tyrus; Gus appears unhurt at first, but the camera slowly tracks around him to reveal that the blast has torn off the right side of his face. He calmly adjusts his tie before collapsing to the floor, dead.

Season 5 

Gus' death has numerous consequences. The continuing investigation into his death reaches his restaurant business and the destroyed superlab, which Walt and Jesse burned after Gus died. Knowing that the security camera recordings stored on Gus's laptop can incriminate them, Walt, Jesse, and Mike use an electromagnet outside the police station to destroy the computer and its hard drive while it is in the police evidence room. The police recover the account numbers and access codes for the offshore accounts Gus previously set up to pay his employees for their silence and seize the accounts. Mike, Walt, and Jesse partner in a new meth business, with Mike continuing to pay Gus's former employees out of his share of the profits in order to assure their continued silence. When police successfully interdict these payments, Walt fears his identity will be exposed and attempts to obtain the employees' names from Mike so he can have them killed. When Mike refuses, Walt kills him. Walt then obtains the names from Lydia Rodarte-Quayle and has Gus's former employees killed in prison before they can reveal Walt's identity, effectively bringing an end to Gus's drug distribution empire.

Reception 
For his portrayal of Gus, Esposito won the Critics' Choice Television Award for Best Supporting Actor in a Drama Series at the 3rd Critics' Choice Television Awards and received three nominations for the Primetime Emmy Award for Outstanding Supporting Actor in a Drama Series. Paste ranked Gus number 3 in its list of the 20 Best Characters of 2011. TV Guide named him  in their 2013 list of The 60 Nastiest Villains of All Time, and in 2016, Rolling Stone ranked him  of their "40 Greatest TV Villains of All Time". Gus's depiction as a gay man has received praise as an example of a compelling antagonist driven by his sexuality.

Although the character of Gus Fring and Esposito's performance has been praised by critics, some native Spanish speakers have criticized the actor's stilted and unnatural accent when speaking Spanish. A 2014 NPR article focusing on representations of Spanish and Spanglish in American television singled out the character of Gus, with one fan saying he was "so painful to listen to" and that it made them angry that "such a pivotal and fantastic character would have such a giant, noticeable, nails-on-a-chalkboard flaw."

Los Pollos Hermanos Employee Training with Gus Fring 
AMC released a series of ten short videos on YouTube and their social media accounts during season three as Los Pollos Hermanos Employee Training with Gus Fring, combining live-action shots featuring Esposito as Gus along with animated segments, presented as employee training videos for Gus' Los Pollos Hermanos restaurant workers. The series won the Primetime Emmy Award for Outstanding Short Form Comedy or Drama Series in 2017.

References

External links 
 Gustavo Fring at AMC
 Gustavo Fring on IMDb

Breaking Bad characters
Better Call Saul characters
Fictional Afro–Latin American people
Fictional business executives
Fictional characters from New Mexico
Fictional murderers of children
Fictional Chilean-American people
Fictional crime bosses
Fictional drug dealers
Fictional gay males
Fictional immigrants to the United States
Fictional LGBT characters in television
Fictional mass murderers
Fictional money launderers
Fictional murdered people
Fictional people with acquired American citizenship
Fictional restaurant staff
Fictional torturers
Television characters introduced in 2009
LGBT villains
Male characters in television
Male villains
Black people in television